A Portuguese Luxembourger or Lusoburguês is a citizen of Luxembourg that either was born in Portugal or is of Portuguese ancestry.  Although estimates of the total Portuguese Luxembourg population vary, on January 1, 2021 there were 94,335 people in Luxembourg with Portuguese nationality, this number excludes many more of Portuguese ancestry or naturalized Luxembourg citizens. They constitute 14.9% of the population of Luxembourg, making them the largest group of foreigner citizens living in the country.

Demographics
It is illegal to collect statistics about the race, ethnicity, or ancestry of Luxembourg citizens, which makes it very difficult to come to a proper estimate of the number of Portuguese Luxembourgers.  In the 2001 census, there were 58,657 inhabitants with Portuguese nationality, up from negligibly few in 1960.

Prior to 1975, Cape Verdean immigrants were registered as Portuguese immigrants from the overseas province of Portuguese Cape Verde.

History
From 1875 onwards, Luxembourg's economy relied upon the immigration of cheap labor of mostly Italians to work in the country's steel mills and to counter the natural demographic decline of the native Luxembourgish population.  The successive waves of immigrants were predominated by Germans and Italians, but, by the 1960s, the influx of foreign workers from these countries slowed, as their home countries' economies had recovered.  By 1967, the Italian expatriate population had begun to decline as Italians returned home.  This coincided with the rise of a booming financial services sector, which caused native Luxembourgers to turn away from industrial jobs.

The mid-1960s saw the arrival of the first Portuguese guest workers (including Cape Verdeans, who also had Portuguese citizenship). At the time, Portugal was ruled as a nationalist authoritarian conservative regime, and an economic downturn coincided with the so-called 'Academic Crisis' and deteriorating conditions in Portugal's colonies to put further pressure on many young Portuguese people to emigrate. 

The two countries signed a treaty in Lisbon in 1970 to allow family unification, and this was enshrined into Luxembourgish law in 1972.  This turned the Portuguese community into a demographically self-sustaining unit, marking it out as separate from the Germans, who had little desire to move permanently to Luxembourg, and Italians, who were not granted special status for family immigration.

When Portugal entered the European Economic Community in 1986, Portuguese citizens were to be guaranteed the same rights to the labor market as Luxembourgish citizens.  All countries were given a transitional period of seven years to adapt to the new conditions, during which they could impose restrictions upon immigration from Portugal (and Spain, the other new EEC member).  Luxembourg was given a longer transitional period, of ten years, as the government feared a large influx of Portuguese immigrants.  When, in 1990, the government found that immigration had barely increased since 1985, it dropped its limitations.

Footnotes

References
 

Luxembourg–Portugal relations
Ethnic groups in Luxembourg
 
Portuguese diaspora in Europe